Donovan Makoma (born 1 February 1999) is a French professional footballer who plays for Andorran club UE Santa Coloma, as a midfielder.

Club career
Born in Lille, after playing with Lens, Makoma signed for English club Barrow in July 2017.

He moved to Stevenage in July 2018. He made his professional debut on 14 August 2018, in the EFL Cup.

On 12 October 2018, Makoma joined National League South club Woking on a 28-day loan.

On 21 December 2018, it was announced that Makoma would join Southern League side, Biggleswade Town on a one-month loan.

In February 2019, he joined Wingate & Finchley on loan until the end of the season.

He was made available for sale by Stevenage at the end of the 2018–19 season.

Following his release from Stevenage, Makoma returned to France to join Arras, before moving to Andorran club UE Santa Coloma.

International career
He represented France at under-16 youth level.

Career statistics

References

1999 births
Living people
French footballers
RC Lens players
Barrow A.F.C. players
Stevenage F.C. players
Woking F.C. players
Biggleswade Town F.C. players
Wingate & Finchley F.C. players
Arras FA players
UE Santa Coloma players
Association football midfielders
France youth international footballers
French expatriate footballers
French expatriate sportspeople in England
Expatriate footballers in England
French expatriate sportspeople in Andorra
Expatriate footballers in Andorra
French sportspeople of Democratic Republic of the Congo descent
Black French sportspeople